General elections were held in Northern Rhodesia on 20 March 1959, although voting did not take place in two constituencies until 9 April. The United Federal Party (UFP) was expected to win the elections, and did so by taking 13 of the 22 elected seats on the Legislative Council.

Electoral system
The elections were the first held under the Lennox-Boyd constitution. It provided for a 30-member Legislative Council with 22 elected members, six official members and two appointed members. The 22 elected seats were divided into 12 "ordinary" seats with mostly European voters, six "special" seats mainly reserved for African voters, two reserved for African candidates and two reserved for European candidates. "Ordinary" voters had to have at least four years of secondary education and either an income of at least £300 a year or own property worth £500. They could also qualify by having primary education and earning at least £480 a year or owning £1,000 of property, or for those not meeting the educational requirements, have an annual income of at least £720 or own over £1,500 of property. Certain people were automatically entitled to register as "ordinary voters", including ministers of religion, chiefs recognised by the Governor and wives of anyone qualified as an "ordinary" voter (although in the case of polygamous marriages, only the senior wife qualified). "Special" voters had to have at least two years of secondary education and an income of at least £120 a year, or have an income of at least £150 or own property worth £500 or more. Automatic qualification as a "special" voter was given to pensioners receiving a monthly or annual pension for at least 20 years' service for one employer, headmen or hereditary councillors with at least two years of unpaid service and who were recognised by their chief, or be the wife (or senior wife) of any qualified "special" voter. All voters had to be over 21, able to complete their registration form in English and have lived in the Federation of Rhodesia and Nyasaland for at two years and in their constituency for three months.

The African reserved seats were created by combining several ordinary seats, whilst the European reserved seats were based on combinations of the special seats. Every voter had two votes, one for their special or ordinary constituency member, and one for their reserved member. In the ordinary and European reserved seats, special votes were not allowed to account for more than a third of the total.

A total of 30,234 people were registered to vote, up from 15,505 for the 1954 elections. Of the 23,388 "ordinary" voters, 20,546 were Europeans, 2,046 Indians and 796 Africans. The 6,846 special voters included 6,821 Africans, 20 Europeans and five Indians.

Campaign
A total of 54 candidates contested the elections, of which 20 were African. Four parties ran in the election, with the UFP led by John Roberts putting forward 18 candidates, the Dominion Party 10, the Central Africa Party led by John Moffat seven and the Northern Rhodesian African National Congress led by Harry Nkumbula one (Nkumbula himself). Seventeen candidates ran as independents, with one running as a Central Africa Party independent. The Zambian African National Congress, a breakaway from the NRANC, called for a boycott. The UFP were unopposed in two seats. No candidates were nominated for the Northern and Luapula Special constituencies, requiring nominations to be reopened until 19 March.

The UFP held a centrist position, supporting dominion status for the Federation of Rhodesia and Nyasaland and opposing the British Colonial Office (reflecting the views of most white Northern Rhodesians). The Dominion Party put forward a right-wing platform including supporting a partition of the Federation into European and African areas. The Central Africa Party ran on a liberal platform.

Results

By voter roll

By constituency

By-elections
By-elections were held in the Luapula and Northern Special constituencies on 9 April.

Aftermath
Following the election, Governor Arthur Benson appointed six ministers; John Roberts as Minister of Labour and Mines, Ebden Carlisle as Minister of Lands and Natural Resources, William Gray Dunlop as Minister of Transport and Works, Rodney Malcomson as Minister of Local Government, Gabriel Musumbulwa as Minister of African Education and Edson Mwamba as Minister of African Agriculture.

See also
List of members of the Legislative Council of Northern Rhodesia (1959–62)

References

1959 in Northern Rhodesia
1959 elections in Africa
1959
1959